Aris Babikian (Armenian: Արիս Պապիկեան) is a Canadian politician who was elected to the Legislative Assembly of Ontario in the 2018 provincial election. He represents the riding of Scarborough—Agincourt as a member of the Progressive Conservative Party of Ontario. Prior to his political career, Babikian served as a Citizenship Judge from 2009 to 2015.

On June 7, 2018, Babikian was elected to the Ontario Legislature, winning over 50% of the vote and breaking 30 years of Liberal representation in Scarborough—Agincourt. He is the first Armenian elected to the Ontario Legislature.

Electoral record

References

Progressive Conservative Party of Ontario MPPs
21st-century Canadian politicians
Living people
Canadian citizenship judges
Canadian people of Armenian descent
People from Scarborough, Toronto
Politicians from Toronto
Year of birth missing (living people)